Hunayn may refer to:

Hunayn, Saudi Arabia, a location
Battle of Hunayn, at Hunayn, Saudi Arabia
Hunayn (name)